Admiralteyskaya is a station on the Frunzensko-Primorskaya Line of the Saint Petersburg Metro. Opened on 28 December 2011, it is designed to relieve congestion at the Nevsky Prospekt and Gostiny Dvor stations, as well as to provide a more direct link to  the Hermitage and other notable museums. However, the completion of the stations was hampered by the lack of funds and ongoing controversy over the placement of station's exit. The station will eventually provide a transfer to the Nevsko-Vasileostrovskaya Line station tentatively designated Admiralteyskaya-2 (the construction of that station has not begun yet). After the exit location was settled, the station Admiralteyskaya-1 on the Frunzensko-Primorskaya Line was scheduled to open in 2008, but concerns over the station's historic significance pushed the opening back. In June 2009, the issue was finally settled and the station opened on 28 December 2011.

The name originates from the Admiralty building, which is located nearby.

History
The station's existence has been controversial for decades. Originally, Admiralteyskaya was going to be built on the Nevsko-Vasileostrovskaya Line, however the construction didn't go underway. Although the need for the station was apparent to the Metro planners for over three decades, the  actual construction proved to be a difficult process. The station was to be built close to Hermitage, several notable museums and several buildings designated as federal landmarks, which raised fears that those buildings would be adversely affected by construction. Thus, determining the location of the exit proved to be a difficult task that, after multiple attempts, was finally resolved on February 7, 2007. According to the city officials, it would be built on the site of the apartment building at #1/4 on Kirpichny Alley. The building was to be torn down so that a vestibule could be built in its place.

With the issue seemingly resolved, the city officials began moving out the building's residents, completely emptying it by the end of 2008. However the construction stalled due to the debate over the building's historic significance (it was the first building to be restored after the Siege of Leningrad). In June 2009, the issue was resolved in the Metro's favor (though the ruling stipulated that the building's original facade must be restored once the building is complete) and June 11, 2009, the contractors began to demolish the building. The construction commenced once all the debris were cleared. 

When the construction of what was originally intended as the northern branch of the Frunzensko-Primorskaya Line began, the underground vestibule of Admiralteystkaya was built, even as the location of the exit remained uncertain. By 1997, most of the vestibule was completed. However, the lack of resolution over the status of the station's exit, combined with scarcity of funds, put further construction on halt. When the northern branch was opened as a temporary part of the Pravoberezhnaya Line, the train passed the unfinished station without stopping, slowing down slightly while transversing it. However, in 2005, the construction resumed. Trains began to occasionally stop at this station in early morning hours to drop off workers.

Transport 
Buses: 2, 7, 3, 10, 22, 24, 27, 191. Trolleybuses: 1, 5, 7, 10, 11, 17, 22.

Architecture
The station is connected to the ground with two consecutive escalators. From this level a shorter escalator leads to the station.

References 

Saint Petersburg Metro stations
Railway stations  in Russia opened in 2011
Railway stations located underground in Russia